Patrick J. O'Reilly (born 8 December 1980) is an Irish actor, director and writer currently living in Belfast, Northern Ireland. He is the recipient of the Stewart Parker Radio Drama Award in 2010. He also adapted Shakespeare's tragedy Othello for Bruiser Theatre Company in 2011.

Work

Writer
His plays include:
Tart 2005
Flesh Dense 2008
The Weein 2009
Dinner, An Edible Cabaret 2010
Othello (as adapted by O'Reilly) 2011
Lady Windermere's Fan (adaptation) 2012
Hatch! Adventures of the Ugly Duck (and director) 2013

He has also taught drama and wrote plays for Starburst Theatre School in Ballyearl.

Actor
O'Reilly has acted in many of his own productions as well as for other productions companies such as Bruiser Theatre Company.

The Conquest of Happiness 2013
The Resistible Rise of Arturo Ui 2010
Oh, What A Lovely War! 2009
Nose 2014

References

External links
 Literary Belfast Adapting Othello the Bruiser Way

Irish male stage actors
Irish writers
1980 births
Living people
People from County Cavan
Male stage actors from Northern Ireland